Ezhuvathiruthy is a village at Ponnani taluk, Malappuram district, Kerala, India.

References 

Malappuram district
Kerala